The Cave of Niño (Spanish: Cueva del Niño) is a cave located in Aýna, Spain. It was declared Bien de Interés Cultural in 1997.

References 

Caves of Spain
Geography of the Province of Albacete
Bien de Interés Cultural landmarks in the Province of Albacete
Landforms of Castilla–La Mancha